The Ring of the People is a political party in Denmark.

History
Inspired by the Spanish political party Podemos, Folkeringen was founded in 2016. Steen D. Hartmann was elected as leader of the party.

References

2016 establishments in Denmark
Political parties established in 2016
Socialist parties in Denmark